Jeanne Stephenson Bodfish (January 7, 1920 — October 31, 2012) was an American politician who served as the 31st Comptroller of the Treasury of Tennessee from 1953 to 1955.

Bodfish was Tennessee's first and only female Comptroller of the Treasury.

Biography 
Bodfish was born in Nashville, Tennessee in 1920 to Margaret and Jay Stephenson. She studied political science at Vanderbilt University and law at the University of Chicago. 

Bodfish was a political science instructor at Vanderbilt University from 1950 to 1952.

In 1953, Bodfish was elected by the Tennessee General Assembly to become the Comptroller of the Treasury of Tennessee. She only served one term of two years.

Bodfish died on October 31, 2012, survived by her two children.

Family and legacy 
Bodfish married Robert Valentine Bodfish in 1945. They had two children: Jayne and John.

The 108th General Assembly of Tennessee recognized Bodfish's "insightful decisions on governmental accountability" and how they impacted the government of Tennessee for the sixty years following her election in 1953.

References 

1920 births
2012 deaths
Comptrollers of the Treasury of Tennessee
Politicians from Nashville, Tennessee
Vanderbilt University alumni
University of Chicago alumni